Ross Buckley is the KPMG Law – King & Wood Mallesons Professor of Disruptive Innovation, and a Scientia Professor, at the University of New South Wales (UNSW Sydney).

As an Australian Research Council Laureate Fellow, he leads a $2.6 million five-year research project into the regulation of the data revolution. He is also a lead investigator on an ARC Discovery Project on China’s Belt and Road Initiative and on major research projects in Hong Kong and Qatar on the regulation of FinTech.

Early life and education 

Ross was born in Brisbane. He has degrees in Economics and Law (with honours) from the University of Queensland. He completed a PhD at UNSW, and, more recently, an LLD at the University of Melbourne.

Career 

Ross began his career in Brisbane with the predecessor firm to Allens Linklaters. He was with Deacons in Hong Kong for a year, before moving to New York City as an associate at Davis Polk for three years. He is admitted to practise law in Queensland and the Southern District of New York.

Ross joined the law faculty at Bond University, where he led the Tim Fischer Centre for Global Trade and Finance for seven years.

Ross joined the law faculty at UNSW in 2007. He was appointed a Scientia Professor and to the King & Wood Mallesons Chair in International Finance Law in 2013. In 2018, KPMG Law joined an expanded sponsorship of this position, which was renamed the KPMG Law – King & Wood Mallesons Professorship of Disruptive Innovation.

Research and publications 

Ross’ research has attracted around A$10 million in grant funding.

His earlier work was mostly on the regulation of the global financial system. This culminated in a book with Douglas Arner, From Crisis to Crisis: The Global Financial System and Regulatory Failure, published by Kluwer.

In 2013 he started researching the regulation of mobile money in developing countries, in response in part to a request from Timor Leste for assistance on these issues.

In 2015, he wrote an article with Douglas Arner and Janos Barberis that has been cited over 1,000 times on the Evolution of Fintech.

He has written five books, edited five books, and written over 160 book chapters and articles in leading journals in all major jurisdictions. Of late, much of his research has been with Douglas Arner of the University of Hong Kong and Dirk Zetzsche of the University of Luxembourg.

Ross has twice been a Fulbright Scholar, at Yale and Duke.

Consultancies 

Ross has served as a consultant to the Asian Development Bank and the Alliance for Financial Inclusion.

He has consulted to government departments in 12 nations, including, in the US, to the US Department of Justice and the Securities and Exchange Commission.

Ross has chaired the Digital Finance Advisory Panel of the Australian Securities and Investments Commission since 2017.

References 

Year of birth missing (living people)
Living people